Tampilisan, officially the Municipality of Tampilisan (Subanen: Benwa Tampilisan; Chavacano: Municipalidad de Tampilisan), is a 4th class municipality in the province of Zamboanga del Norte, Philippines. According to the 2020 census, it has a population of 24,680 people.

It is located in Zamboanga peninsula along the boundary with Zamboanga Sibugay, traversed by the national highway to Zamboanga City.

History
The name Tampilisan originated from a tree called "Tampilis". This tree is about one to three meters in height, belongs to the palm family. Its sturdy part when split was used by the natives, Subanen, as a substitute for betel nuts. Since this tree were abundant in the area, the place thus called by the native as "Tampilisan".

The municipality was originally a barangay of the Municipality of Liloy, Zamboanga del Norte. In the early part of 1978, because of the concentration of population and potentials of the area and through consultation of the local leaders, Assemblyman Guardson Lood filed a bill in the Interim Batasang Pambansa, Batas Pambansa Bilang 14 an "Act Creating the Municipality of Tampilisan".

The newly created municipality originally comprised seven barangays: Poblacion, Cabong, Galingon, Situbo, Lawaan, Molos, and New Dapitan, with the Poblacion as the seat of the municipal government. Today, the Municipality of Tampilisan has grown to twenty barangays: the seven preceding barangays plus thirteen more barangays: Sandayong, Tilubog, Tininggaan, Tubod, Balacbaan, Banbanan, Zamboanga del Norte Agricultural College (ZNAC), Camul, New Barili, Santo Niño, Farmington, Lumbayao, and Malila T.

The first appointed and elected mayor was Cesar A. Bomediano, a former SB Member of the Municipality of Liloy, Zamboanga del Norte.

Geography

Barangays
Tampilisan is politically subdivided into 20 barangays.

Climate

Demographics

Economy

References

External links
 Tampilisan Profile at PhilAtlas.com
 [ Philippine Standard Geographic Code]
Philippine Census Information

Municipalities of Zamboanga del Norte